Anderson de Carvalho Santos (born 20 May 1990) is a Brazilian footballer who plays as a defensive midfielder for Santa Clara in Portuguese Primeira Liga.

Career
Born in Cubatão, Carvalho made his debut as a professional on 30 January 2011, replacing Rodrigo Possebon in a 2–0 home success against São Paulo, for the Campeonato Paulista championship. Three days later he was handed his first start, playing 56 minutes in a 2–2 away draw against Ponte Preta, but being replaced due to Rafael's ejection.

In August 2012, Carvalho was loaned to Japanese club Vissel Kobe until December. However, he suffered with muscular injuries in Japan, and returned to Brazil without appearing for the club. On 11 December, he was loaned out to Penapolense until the end of 2013 Campeonato Paulista.

On 1 July 2014, Carvalho was deemed surplus to requirements by new manager Oswaldo de Oliveira, and after rescinding his link with Peixe, joined Portuguese side Boavista in a three-year deal. He played his first match in a 1-0 home victory against Académica, and two weeks later scored two goals in a 3-2 home victory against Gil Vicente.

On 1 July 2017, he signed a 2-year contract with the Russian Premier League club FC Tosno.

Career statistics

Honours

Club
Santos
Campeonato Paulista: 2011, 2012

References

External links

1990 births
Living people
Brazilian footballers
Association football midfielders
Campeonato Brasileiro Série A players
Santos FC players
J1 League players
Vissel Kobe players
Boavista F.C. players
FC Tosno players
C.D. Santa Clara players
Primeira Liga players
Russian Premier League players
Brazilian expatriate footballers
Brazilian expatriate sportspeople in Japan
Expatriate footballers in Japan
Brazilian expatriate sportspeople in Portugal
Expatriate footballers in Portugal
Expatriate footballers in Russia
People from Cubatão